Richard Andrew Patten (May 13, 1942 – December 30, 2021) was a Canadian politician. Patten was a Liberal member of the Legislative Assembly of Ontario from 1987 to 1990 and again from 1995 to 2007. He represented the riding of Ottawa Centre. He served as a cabinet minister in the government of David Peterson.

Personal life
Patten was educated at Sir George Williams University in Montreal. He worked as a manager with the Young Men's Christian Association (YMCA), and served as President of the Canadian Council for International Cooperation. Patten sat on an NGO advisory committee to the World Bank while with the CCIC. He died on December 30, 2021, at the age of 79.

Politics
In the 1987 provincial election, Patten ran as the Liberal candidate in the riding of Ottawa Centre. He defeated incumbent New Democrat Evelyn Gigantes by just over 2,000 votes. The Liberal party won the election and Patten was appointed  Minister of Government Services. In August 1989 he was shuffled to Minister of Correctional Services.

In the 1990 provincial election Patten was defeated by his NDP rival Gigantes. For the next five years, Patten served as President and CEO of the Children's Hospital of Eastern Ontario (CHEO) Foundation, doing extensive fund-raising work for the organization.

In 1995 provincial election Patten campaigned against Gigantes once again this time defeating her by 1,700 votes. The Progressive Conservatives won the election, and Patten joined 29 other Liberals in the opposition. He attempted to mobilize a campaign for the party's leadership in 1996, but failed in this effort and subsequently supported Dwight Duncan. When Duncan was eliminated after the third ballot, he endorsed Dalton McGuinty, the eventual winner.

In the 1999 provincial election, Patten was re-elected over Progressive Conservative Ray Kostuch and New Democrat Elisabeth Arnold. The Progressive Conservatives again won the election, and Patten remained in opposition. Patten was treated for non-Hodgkin's lymphoma during this parliament.

The Liberals won the 2003 election and he was re-elected again by over 10,000 votes. During this session he served as parliamentary assistant to the Minister of Education, the Minister of Economic Development and Trade and to Premier Dalton McGuinty. Patten maintained a strong interest in the CHEO and devoted legislative efforts towards the centre's operations.

On 14 March 2007, Patten announced he would not seek re-election in the upcoming election, preferring to focus on work with the CHEO Foundation.

Cabinet positions

Electoral record

References

External links

1942 births
2021 deaths
21st-century Canadian politicians
Anglophone Quebec people
Canadian Unitarians
Members of the Executive Council of Ontario
Ontario Liberal Party MPPs
Politicians from Montreal
Politicians from Ottawa
Sir George Williams University alumni